The following is a list of county roads in Okaloosa County, Florida.  All county roads are maintained by the county in which they reside.

County roads in Okaloosa County, Florida

References

FDOT Map of Okaloosa County
FDOT GIS data, accessed January 2014

External links
Okaloosa County Roads (AARoads)

 
County